Henry Babcock Veatch Jr. (September 26, 1911 – July 9, 1999) was an American philosopher.

Life and career
Veatch was born September 26, 1911, in Evansville, Indiana.  He attended Harvard University, where he received his A.B. and M.A. degrees and obtained his PhD in 1937. Veatch came to the Philosophy Department at Indiana University as an instructor in 1937. He was named assistant professor in 1941 and full professor in 1952. While at Indiana University, Veatch received many awards and honors. In 1954, he became the first recipient of the Frederick Bachman Lieber Award for Distinguished  Teaching. He was popular with his students and was awarded the Sigma Delta Chi "Brown Derby" Award for most popular professor. In 1961, Veatch was named Distinguished Service Professor.

In 1965, Veatch left IU for Northwestern University where he remained until 1973. He then went to Georgetown University, where he was philosophy department chair from 1973 to 1976. Veatch also had visiting professorships at Colby College, Haverford College and St. Thomas University. In 1983, he retired as a distinguished professor and returned to Bloomington.

Veatch was active in the Episcopal Church and served as president of the American Catholic Philosophical Association. He served as president of the Metaphysical Society of America in 1961. In 1970–71 he served as president of the Western Division of the American Philosophical Association. He was a member of the Guild of Scholars of The Episcopal Church.

Henry Veatch died in Bloomington, Indiana.  Indiana University maintains the archive of his collected papers (1941–1997).

Philosophy
Veatch was a major proponent of rationalism, an authority on Thomistic philosophy, and one of the leading neo-Aristotelian thinkers of his time.  He opposed such modern and contemporary developments as the "transcendental turn" and the "linguistic turn."  A staunch advocate of plain speaking and "Hoosier" common sense, in philosophy and elsewhere, he argued on behalf of realist metaphysics and practical ethics.

Veatch's most widely read book was Rational Man: A Modern Interpretation of Aristotelian Ethics (1962) which explicitly offered a rationalist counterpoint to William Barrett's well-known study in existential philosophy, Irrational Man (1958).

Major works
Concerning the Ontological Status of Logical Forms (1948)
Aristotelian and Mathematical Logic (1950)In Defense of the Syllogism (1950)Metaphysics and the Paradoxes (1952)Intentional Logic: A Logic Based on Philosophical Realism (1952)Realism and Nominalism Revisited (1954)Logic as a Human Instrument (1959, with Francis Parker)Rational Man: A Modern Interpretation of Aristotelian Ethics (1962)The Truths of Metaphysics (1964)Non-cognitivism in Ethics: A modest proposal for its diagnosis and cure (1966)Two Logics: the Conflict between Classical and Neo-Analytic Philosophy (1969)For an Ontology of Morals: A Critique of Contemporary Ethical Theory  (1971)Aristotle: A Contemporary Appreciation (1974)Human Rights: Fact or Fancy (1985)Swimming Against the Current in Contemporary Philosophy'' (1990)

See also
American philosophy
List of American philosophers

Notes

External links
 Henry Babcock Veatch papers, 1941-1997 at the Indiana University Archives.

1911 births
1999 deaths
20th-century American philosophers
20th-century American educators
American Episcopalians
American logicians
American philosophy academics
Anglican philosophers
Aristotelian philosophers
Georgetown University faculty
Harvard University alumni
Harvard University staff
Indiana University faculty
Metaphysicians
Northwestern University faculty
People from Evansville, Indiana
Presidents of the Metaphysical Society of America